The elongate glassy perchlet (Chanda nama) is a species of freshwater fish in the Asiatic glassfish family Ambassidae of order Perciformes, the only species in the genus Chanda. It is native to an area of south Asia from Pakistan to Burma, in the Indomalayan realm.

The species inhabits canals, ponds, streams, and flooded rice paddies, in both fresh and brackish water, and is found in particular abundance during the rainy season.  The species feeds  on mosquito larvae and worms and also eats the scales of other fishes (lepidophagy), the species may have potential use in controlling malaria and parasites.

The fish are harvested and sold for food in local markets.

Several other species of family Ambassidae were formerly classified in genus Chanda, including the well-known Indian glassy fish, Parambassis ranga, the "glassfish" of the aquarium trade; and the high-finned glass perchlet, Parambassis lala, once considered the type species of the genus.

The elongate glassy perchlet is known by a variety of names locally, including "perchlet" and several variations on its generic name ("chanda", "channa", etc.); internationally it is also known as the elongated glassfish.

References

 

Ambassidae
Fish of Pakistan
Taxa named by Francis Buchanan-Hamilton
Fish described in 1822